Edward Joseph Lakso (September 20, 1932 – May 23, 2009) was an American screenwriter, producer, and composer, known for his work on series such as Star Trek, Planet of the Apes, Charlie's Angels and Combat!. He is sometimes miscredited as Edward J. Lasko.

Life and career
Lakso graduated from UCLA with a degree in music and taught briefly in the Los Angeles school district. While attending UCLA, he wrote the screenplay for Operation Dames, a Korean War drama about a USO troop trapped behind enemy lines shot in Topanga Canyon, California.

While serving in the United States Air Force he wrote a musical with Tommy Oliver (they would later work again on Watergate: the Musical).

Lakso co-wrote and scored The Immoral Mr. Teas, an early film by Russ Meyer, and scripted several other films, including The Broken Land (1962; the screen debut for Jack Nicholson), Gentle Giant (1967), and the blaxploitation film Brother on the Run (1973), which he co-directed with Herbert Stock.

Lakso is best known for his television work, writing Combat!, Star Trek, Planet of the Apes, Charlie's Angels, The Rockford Files, Name of the Game, Starsky & Hutch, Airwolf, The Fall Guy, and Hawaii Five-O. He also composed music for Charlie's Angels and Dr. Kildare. He was also the line producer on the Charlie's Angels episodic television show, following Barney Rosensweig's brief tenure in that job.

Lakso also wrote, produced and directed several musicals. In 1967, he spent a summer in West Yellowstone, writing and producing a melodrama at the Golden Garter Theatre which. Later, Tom Piper, for which he wrote the book, music and lyrics was produced at the Goodspeed Opera House in East Haddam, Connecticut, and starred Harve Presnell, Watergate, the Musical written and produced with Tommy Oliver at the Alliance Theater in Atlanta Georgia which starred Gene Barry; and Vincent, the Musical staged at the Las Palmas theater in Hollywood with his wife, Lee Travis, who co-produced and designed the costumes.

Family

Lakso and first wife, his home-town sweetheart Ruth Louise (Laird) Lakso, married in 1953 and divorced in 1961. Together they had 2 children, both girls, one of whom worked with him in the 1970s, providing story lines for 9 episodes of Charlie's Angels (under the name "Laurie Lakso Beasley") when he was the line producer. In 1967, Ed married 29-year-old Diane H. Haggin, a model and actress. The marriage lasted until 1974. In 1985, he was married to 37-year-old writer-actress-producer Lee Travis.

Lakso died from complications of Parkinson's disease on May 23, 2009, at home in Beverly Hills.

References

External links

1932 births
2009 deaths
American male television writers
Screenwriters from California
20th-century American male writers
20th-century American screenwriters